Caloptilia schinusifolia is a moth of the family Gracillariidae. It is found in Rio de Janeiro, Brazil.

The larvae feed on Schinus terebinthifolius and Lithrea molleoides. They mine the leaves of their host plant.

References

Moths described in 2011
schinusifolia
Moths of South America